Tezcatlipoca was a central deity in Aztec religion. He is associated with many different concepts, like the night sky,  hurricanes, obsidian, and conflict. He was considered one of the four sons of Ometecuhtli and Omecihuatl, the primordial dual deity. His main festival was Toxcatl, which involved human sacrifice. 

A talisman related to Tezcatlipoca was a disc worn as a chest pectoral. This talisman was carved out of abalone shell and depicted on the chest of both Huitzilopochtli and Tezcatlipoca in codex illustrations.

When depicted he was usually drawn with a black and a yellow stripe painted across his face. He is often shown with his right foot replaced with an obsidian mirror, bone, or a snake — an allusion to the creation myth in which he loses his foot battling with the Earth Monster. Sometimes the mirror was shown on his chest, and sometimes smoke would emanate from the mirror. Tezcatlipoca's nagual, his animal counterpart, was the jaguar and his jaguar aspect was the deity Tepeyollotl ("Mountainheart"). In the Aztec ritual calendar, the Tonalpohualli, Tezcatlipoca ruled the trecena 1 Ocelotl ("1 Jaguar"); he was also patron of the days with the name Acatl ("reed").

The Tezcatlipoca figure goes back to earlier Mesoamerican deities worshipped by the Olmec and Maya. Similarities exist with the patron deity of the K'iche' Maya as described in the Popol Vuh.  A central figure of the Popol Vuh was the god Tohil whose name means "obsidian" and who was associated with sacrifice. Also the Classic Maya god of rulership and thunder known to modern Mayanists as "God K", or the "Manikin Scepter" and to the classic Maya as K'awil was depicted with a smoking obsidian knife in his forehead and one leg replaced with a snake. Although there are striking similarities between possible earlier imagery of Tezcatlipoca, archaeologists are split in the debate. It is possible that he is either the same god that the Olmec and Maya reference with their "jaguar deity" or that Tezcatlipoca is a latter, more expanded version of the foundations the Olmec and Maya set, as the Aztecs often took inspiration from earlier cultures.

Etymology 
His name in the Nahuatl language is often translated as "Smoking Mirror". It alludes to his connection to obsidian, the material from which mirrors were made in Mesoamerica. They were used for shamanic rituals and prophecy.

He had many epithets which alluded to different aspects of his deity: Titlacauan ( "We Are His Slaves"), Ipalnemoani ("He by Whom We Live"), Necoc Yaotl ("Enemy of Both Sides"). 

Other names were Tloque Nahuaque ("Lord of the Near and the Nigh"), Yohualli Èhecatl ("Night, Wind"). Also, Ome Acatl ("Two Reed"), Ilhuicahua Tlalticpaque ("Possessor of the Sky and Earth").

Representations

There are few surviving representations of Tezcatlipoca into the present day, expedited by a significant portion of Codexes being destroyed by Catholic priests.  Due to the lack of surviving images, some have chosen to describe Tezcatlipoca as the 'invisible god'.  However, the fact that many images are difficult to identify as one god or another does not mean that no generalizations can be made about Tezcatlipoca's appearance.  The color black is strongly associated with Tezcatlipoca and he is often portrayed as having horizontal bands across his face especially in black and yellow, but the many different codices vary on which two colors from site to site.  There are also portrayals of his body also being black in certain places.  Depending on the site half of his leg, the full length of his arms, the majority of his legs, or any combination thereof can be depicted.  Most commonly he is shown with horizontal face bands, wearing a heron feather headdress, a loincloth, and knotted sandals with an armband, and tinker bells either around his neck or ankles.  Tezcatlipoca is often shown carrying a shield with balls of either feathers or cotton and holding arrows or a spear in his right hand with a fan of feathers surrounding a mirror.

Temples
Many of the temples now associated with Tezcatlipoca are built facing east–west, as Olivier quotes Felipe Solis: "the sacred building of the war god [Tezcatlipoca] was in direct relation with the movement of the sun, in the same manner of the Great Temple was, their façades being towards the West".  There are also several references to momoztli.  Although the exact definition of the momoztli is unknown, with definitions varying from "mound", "stone seat" and "temple", there is an overall consensus that it is a general holy place to worship the gods, specifically mentioned as "his [Tezcatlipoca's] viewing place".

Priests
The priests of Tezcatlipoca often wore the ornaments of the god and wore specific garments for different rituals. Common ornaments were white turkey feather headdresses, a paper loincloth, and a tzanatl stick with similar feathers and paper decorations. Another common practice was to cover themselves in black soot or ground charcoal while they were involved in priestly activities at the temple or during rituals. They would also cover the sick and newly appointed king in a similar manner with a black ointment to encourage an association with the god.  When the ritual called for it, priests would also dress up as Tezcatlipoca himself and accompany other similarly outfitted gods or goddesses. More on the exact rituals, such as the Feast of Toxcatl will be mentioned later.

Tezcatlipoca and Quetzalcoatl

Tezcatlipoca was often described as a rival of another important god of the Aztecs, the culture hero, Quetzalcoatl. In one version of the Aztec creation account the myth of the Five Suns, the first creation, "The Sun of the Earth" was ruled by Tezcatlipoca but destroyed by Quetzalcoatl when he struck down Tezcatlipoca who then transformed into a jaguar. Quetzalcoatl became the ruler of the subsequent creation "Sun of Water", and Tezcatlipoca destroyed the third creation "The Sun of Wind" by striking down Quetzalcoatl.

In later myths, the four gods who created the world, Tezcatlipoca, Quetzalcoatl, Huitzilopochtli and Xipe Totec were referred to respectively as the Black, the White, the Blue and the Red Tezcatlipoca. The four Tezcatlipocas were the sons of Ometecuhtli and Omecihuatl, lady and lord of the duality, and were the creators of all the other gods, as well as the world and all humanity.

The rivalry between Quetzalcoatl and Tezcatlipoca is also recounted in the legends of Tollan where Tezcatlipoca deceives Quetzalcoatl who was the ruler of the legendary city and forces him into exile. Quetzalcoatl and Tezcatlipoca both collaborated in the different creations and that both were seen as instrumental in the creation of life. Karl Taube and Mary Miller, specialists in Mesoamerican Studies, write that, "More than anything Tezcatlipoca appears to be the embodiment of change through conflict." Tezcatlipoca appears on the first page of the Codex Borgia carrying the 20 day signs of the calendar; in the Codex Cospi he is shown as a spirit of darkness, as well as in the Codex Laud and the Dresden Codex. His cult was associated with royalty, and was the subject of the most lengthy and reverent prayers in the rites of kingship, as well as being mentioned frequently in coronation speeches. The temple of Tezcatlipoca was in the Great Precinct of Tenochtitlan.

Aztec religion 
Tezcatlipoca is associated with many different concepts, like the night sky, the night winds, hurricanes, the north, the earth, obsidian, hostility, discord, rulership, divination, temptation, jaguars, sorcery, beauty, war, and conflict. His main temple in Tenochtitlan was located south of the Great Temple. According to Fray Diego Durán it was "lofty and magnificently built. Eighty steps led to a landing twelve or fourteen feet wide. Beyond it stood a wide, long chamber the size of a great hall...". There were several smaller temples dedicated to Tezcatlipoca in the city, among them the ones called "Tlacochcalco" and "Huitznahuatl". Tezcatlipoca was also worshipped in many other Nahua cities such as Texcoco, Tlaxcala and Chalco. Each temple had a statue of the god for which copal incense was burned four times a day. There were several priests dedicated to the service of Tezcatlipoca, one of them was probably the one Sahagún calls "huitznahuac teohua omacatl", others were the calmeca teteuctin who were allowed to eat the ritual food offered to Tezcatlipoca, others accompanied the Ixiptlatli impersonator of Tezcatlipoca in the year prior to his execution.  Honoring Tezcatlipoca was fundamental to both the priesthood and the nobility. "On his installation," the new king fasted and meditated, "which included prayers in honor of Tezcatlipoca, the patron deity of the royal house". Tezcatlipoca priests were offered into his service by their parents as children, often because they were sick. These children would then have their skin painted black and be adorned with quail feathers in the image of the god. Sacred hymns were also chanted at ceremonies to honor the gods. Most were sung to praise the highest deities, including Tezcatlipoca, who was often addressed as the "Giver of Life." In one particular hymn, he is mentioned as being both the creator and destroyer of the world, and both as a poet and a scribe. Everyone, including commoners, high priests, and the king, were involved in some aspect of the Toxcatl ceremonies.

Tezcatlipoca's main feast was during Toxcatl, the fifth month of the Aztec calendar.  The preparations began a year earlier, when a young man was chosen by the priests to be the likeness of Tezcatlipoca. This individual was called the ixiptla or "deity impersonator" and was chosen to ceremonially represent the god to the Aztec people. Sometimes, slaves were purchased for the ceremony, and in this case, were bathed carefully to erase impurities. Women were sometimes sacrificed as ixiptla to honor female deities. However, ixiptla were usually selected from among captive warriors, and the chosen individual was bathed and ceremoniously cleansed for the role that he was to undertake. For the next year he lived like a god, wearing expensive jewelry and having eight attendants. The young man also was dressed in the likeness of the god and people on the streets would worship him as such when encountered. "For one year he lived a life of honor," the handsome young man "worshipped literally as the embodiment of the deity". During the last 20 days before being sacrificed, the ixiptla had their appearance transformed back to that of a warrior. "He had been a warrior who was captured, and he ended his life as a warrior." He would then be wed to four young women, also chosen in advance and isolated for a full year and treated as goddesses. This marriage, occurring after a full year of abstinence, symbolized a period of fertility which followed the drought. The young man would spend his last week singing, feasting and dancing. During the feast where he was worshipped as the deity he personified, he climbed the stairs to the top of the temple on his own where the priests seized him, a time in which he proceeded to symbolically crush "one by one the clay flutes on which he had played in his brief moment of glory," and then was sacrificed, his body being eaten later. The young man would approach this sacrifice willingly, as being sacrificed in this manner was a great honor. "Sacrificial victims mounted the bloody steps of the pyramid with dignity and pride. "The sacrifice itself marked the end of the drought. Immediately after he died a new victim for the next year's ceremony was chosen. Tezcatlipoca was also honoured during the ceremony of the 9th month, when the Miccailhuitontli "Little Feast of the Dead" was celebrated to honour the dead, as well as during the Panquetzaliztli "Raising of Banners" ceremony in the 15th month.

Creation histories
In one of the Aztec accounts of creation, Quetzalcoatl and Tezcatlipoca joined forces to create the world. Before their act there was only the sea and the crocodilian earthmonster called Cipactli. To attract her, Tezcatlipoca used his foot as bait, and Cipactli ate it. The two gods then captured her, and distorted her to make the land from her body. After that, they created the people, and people had to offer sacrifices to comfort Cipactli for her sufferings. Because of this, Tezcatlipoca is depicted with a missing foot.

Another story of creation goes that Tezcatlipoca turned himself into the sun, but Quetzalcoatl was furious possibly because they were enemies, he is a night god or due to his missing foot, so he knocked Tezcatlipoca out of the sky with a stone club. Angered, Tezcatlipoca turned into a jaguar and destroyed the world. Quetzalcoatl replaced him and started the second age of the world and it became populated again.

Tezcatlipoca overthrew Quetzalcoatl, forcing him to send a great wind that devastated the world, and the people who survived were turned into monkeys. Tlaloc, the god of rain, then became the sun. But he had his wife taken away by Tezcatlipoca. Angered in turn, he would not make it rain for several years until, in a fit of rage, he made it rain fire with the few people who survived the assault turning into the birds.

Chalchihuitlicue the Water Goddess then became the sun. However, she was crushed by Tezcatlipoca's accusation that she only pretended to be kind. She cried for many years and the world was destroyed by the resulting floods. Those people who survived the deluge were turned into fish.

Aztec reverence

As discussed above, Aztec folklore is rife with parallels, much of the time depicted in deities such as Tezcatlipoca. For Aztec nobility, this "patron deity" is fundamental in the social and natural phenomena justified by religion during this time.  Extreme reverence and respect, characterized by ceremonial proceedings in which priests were "to pay homage" to Tezcatlipoca, or where "citizens waited expectantly" for ceremonial proceedings to start under the low hum of "shell trumpets," were commonplace, especially for this deity. Utter respect from the highest position of Aztec nobility, the king, shown through the figurative and literal nakedness of his presence in front of Tezcatlipoca. The king would stand "naked, emphasizing his utter unworthiness," speaking as nothing but a vessel for the god's will. The new king would claim his spiritual nakedness symbolically through words and physical vulnerability, praising Tezcatlipoca with lines such as:

O master, O our lord, O lord of the near, of the night, O night, O wind...Poor am I.
In what manner shall I act for thy city? In what manner shall I act for the governed, for the vassals (macehualtin)?
For I am blind, I am deaf, I am an imbecile, and in excrement, in filth hath my lifetime been...
Perhaps thou mistaketh me for another; perhaps thou seekest another in my stead

For kings, lords, priests, and citizens alike, the cyclical nature they observed every day and every year was portrayed not through science or philosophical debate, but utter reverence and respect for the spiritual beings they believed were the cause of these events.  It was gods like Tezcatlipoca that solidified this notion, representing both the silent wind, and thunderous war.

In modern culture

 Tezcatlipoca appears as one of the main antagonists in the videogame Broken Sword II: The Smoking Mirror.
 In Victor and Valentino, a recurring antagonist simply referred to as "Tez" is based on the Aztec god.
 Tezca Tlipoca is one of the characters in the manga series Soul Eater, as the Death Scythe responsible for watching over South America. His weapon form is a mirror.
 The god is a central element in the episode "Black Monday" from Secret Saturdays.
 Tezcatlipoca is featured as one of the primary antagonists in Tokyo Afterschool Summoners known as the world representative of El Dorado.
 He is featured as an Assassin class servant in the mobile game Fate Grand Order

See also
Jaguars in Mesoamerican cultures
 Lords of the Night (mythology)
Nagual
Quetzalcoatl

Footnotes

Notes

In-text citations

References

External links

 Tezcatlipoca - World History Encyclopedia
 Mexicolore - Tezcatlipoca Symposium
  https://www.youtube.com/watch?v=C3yYjzEhI5M

Aztec gods
Creator gods
Earth gods
Magic gods
Night gods
War gods
Beauty gods
Sky and weather gods
Chaos gods
Animal gods
Wind gods
Oracular gods 
Justice gods 
Trickster gods
Mythological felines
Mesoamerican deities